The Piano Room is a 2013 Macedonian drama film directed by Igor Ivanov Izi.

Cast 
 Nataša Petrović — Maid
 Jovica Mihajlovski — Manager
 Svetozar Cvetković — Dize
 Vasil Zafircev — Ira
 Torsten Voges — Victor
 Iva Krajnc — Eva

References

External links 

2013 drama films
2013 films
Macedonian drama films